Katonah Village Historic District is a national historic district located at Katonah, Westchester County, New York. The district contains 38 contributing buildings developed between 1895 and 1928 in "New Katonah."  It is primarily residential, but also includes three churches and two combination residential-professional office space buildings.  The street pattern was designed by the Olmsted Brothers and there are representative buildings in the Queen Anne and Late Victorian styles.

It was added to the National Register of Historic Places in 1983.

See also
National Register of Historic Places listings in northern Westchester County, New York

References
 

Houses on the National Register of Historic Places in New York (state)
Historic districts on the National Register of Historic Places in New York (state)
Queen Anne architecture in New York (state)
Victorian architecture in New York (state)
Houses in Westchester County, New York
National Register of Historic Places in Westchester County, New York